Max Frei is the pen name of Svetlana Yuryevna Martynchik (born 1965 in Odessa, Ukrainian SSR, Soviet Union), a fantasy writer from Odessa, Ukraine. She writes in Russian and mostly publishes in Russia while holding Ukrainian citizenship. She permanently resides in Vilnius, Lithuania. Martynchik has collaborated many years on her books with her spouse, artist Igor Steopin (1967—2018).

Biography
Martynchik has Belarusian and German roots. She studied philology at Odessa State University, but dropped out without graduating. From 1986 she collaborated with artist Igor Steopin, whom she later married. The couple moved to Moscow, Russia, in 1993, to work at Marat Gelman's gallery. There, Svetlana started writing fantasy books.

The pen name, Max Frei, was invented by Martynchik and Steopin for their works on comic fantasy series Labyrinths of Echo. The plot follows the eponymous narrator, sir Max, as he leaves our "real" world for phantasmagoric fantasy city of Echo. There, he becomes a member of special service that controls the use of magic. The books are written by Martynchik, while Steopin developed the Echo universe and illustrated the books. Along with her Echo books, Frei also participated in several literary projects. She compiled Fram, a series of short story anthologies by Amphora publishing house.

The couple moved to Vilnius, Lithuania, in 2004, out of their dislike of megalopolises. There, Max Frei wrote four parts of magic realist Tales of the Old Vilnius.

Bibliography

Cycle of books "Labyrinths of Echo" 
 Чужак (Stranger, 1996)
 Волонтёры Вечности (Volunteers of Eternity, 1996)
 Простые волшебные вещи (Simple magic things, 1997)
 Тёмная сторона (The Dark Side, 1997)
 Наваждения (Illusions, 1998)
 Власть несбывшегося (Power of Unfulfilled, 1998)
 Болтливый мертвец (A Talkative Dead, 1999)
 Лабиринт Мёнина (Labyrinth of Mönin, 2003)

Cycle of books "My Ragnarok" 
 Гнёзда химер. Хроники Овёттганы. (Nests of chimeras. Chronicles of Ovёtganna (editorial version) (1997))
 Гнёзда химер. Хроники Хугайды (Nests of chimeras. Chronicles of Hugayda (author's version) (1999))
 Мой Рагнарёк (My Ragnarok, 1998)

Cycle of books "Chronicles of Echo" 
 Чуб Земли. История, рассказанная сэром Максом из Ехо (The Earth’s Tuft. The story told by Sir Max from Echo, 2004)
 Туланский детектив. История, рассказанная леди Меламори Блимм  (Detective from Tulane. The story told by lady Melamory Blimm, 2004)
 Властелин Морморы. История, рассказанная сэром Джуффином Халли (Lord of the Marmore. The story told by Sir Juffin Hulley, 2005)
 Неуловимый Хабба Хэн. История, рассказанная сэром Максом из Ехо  (Elusive Habba Heng. The story told by Sir Max from Echo, 2005)
 Ворона на мосту. История, рассказанная сэром Шурфом Лонли-Локли (Crow on the bridge. The story told by Sir Shurf Lonely - Lockley, 2006)
 Горе господина Гро. История, рассказанная сэром Кофой Йохом (Mr. Gro’s Sorrow. The story told by Sir Cofa Joch, 2007)
 Обжора - хохотун. История, рассказанная сэром Мелифаро (Laughing Glutton. The story told by Sir Melifaro, 2010)
 Дар Шаванахолы. История, рассказанная сэром Максом из Ехо (Gift from Shavanahola. The story told by Sir Max from Echo, 2011)
 Тубурская игра. История, рассказанная сэром Нумминорихом Кутой (Tubur Game. The story told by Sir Numminorih Kuta, 2013)

Cycle of books "Dreams of Echo" 
 Мастер ветров и закатов (The Master of Winds and Sundowns, 2014)
 Слишком много кошмаров (Too Many Nightmares, 2015)
 Вся правда о нас (All Truth About Us, 2015)
 Я иду искать (Coming, ready or not, 2016)
 Сундук мертвеца (Dead Man's Chest, 2017)
 Отдай моё сердце (Give Me My Heart, 2017)
 Мёртвый ноль (Dead Zero, 2018)

Other 
 Энциклопедия Мифов (Encyclopedia of Myths)
 Жалобная книга (A Petition Book, 2003)
 Книга для таких, как я (Book for the Likes of Me, 2002)
 Идеальный роман (An Ideal Novel, 1999)
 Книга одиночеств (Book of Loneliness, 2004) — with Linor Goralik.
 Сказки и истории (Tales and Stories, 2004)
 Ключ из жёлтого металла (Yellow Metal Key, 2009)
 Большая телега (A Big Carriage, 2009)
 Одна и та же книга (The Very Same Book, 2010)
 Первая линия (First line, 2012)
 Вторая линия (Second Line, 2012)
 Сказки старого Вильнюса (Tales of the Old Vilnius, 2012)

References

External links 

 Chingizid—Svetlana Martynchik's blog (in Russian)
Polly Gannon, English language translator of Max Frei and others at GoodReads
Official website of Max Frei 
Max Frei in Moscow Library—some texts by Max Frei 

1965 births
Living people
Ukrainian fantasy writers
Writers from Odesa